Kara is a Nepali-language novel by Sushila Karki. It was published on December 9, 2019 by Kitab Publishers. Karki is the first female Chief Justice of Nepal. It is the second book of the author who previously published an autobiography - Nyaya. The novel is inspired by Karki's own jail time experience during 1990s. The book was launched in a ceremony on the premises of Nepal Academy by former Police Chief Ramesh Kharel and Chief Justice Sapana Malla.

Synopsis 
The novel is the story of female prisoners. Karki herself was prisoned during the Panchayat regime in the 90s. The major theme of the book is about the bondage of the women in the society. Its hows the discrimination that a woman has to face in the society.

Reception 
The book received mild responses from the critics. Chief justice Sapana Malla called the book as "a reality of Nepalese society" during the launch event of the book. Laxmi Basnet in her review for Himal Khabar criticized the book for it "linguistic weakness". Phanindra Sangram called the book "a 'fresh content' for Nepalese readers  despite its certain drawbacks" for his review for Koseli (weekly) of Kantipur newspaper.

See also 

 Nyaya
 Shirishko Phool
 Parityakta

References 

21st-century Nepalese novels
21st-century Nepalese books
Nepalese novels
Cultural depictions of Nepalese women
2019 Nepalese novels
Nepali-language novels
Novels set in Nepal